Ibn Sina National College for Medical Studies is the first private medical college of higher education under the supervision of the Ministry of Higher Education, Kingdom of Saudi Arabia. The college is promoted by Al-Jedani Group of Hospitals, KSA. It is located in the southern part of the historic city Jeddah, on the Red Sea coast.

INCMS is accredited by the Saudi Ministry of Education and the Saudi Commission for Health Specialties. It is also recognized by the World Health Organization and the International Medical Education Directory.

The college offers a variety of undergraduate and postgraduate programs in medicine, nursing, and clinical pharmacy.

References

External links 
 Ibn Sina National College (English)

2004 establishments in Saudi Arabia
Educational institutions established in 2004
Education in Jeddah
Universities and colleges in Saudi Arabia
King Saud University